Nahr-e Kut (also Romanized as Nahr-e Kūt; also known as Kūt) is a village in Nasar Rural District, Arvandkenar District, Abadan County, Khuzestan Province, Iran. At the 2006 census, its population was 196, in 39 families.

References 

Populated places in Abadan County